Paul Jan Veenemans (21 January 1947 – 6 February 1973) was a Dutch rower. He competed at the 1972 Summer Olympics in the doubled sculls, together with Jan Bruyn, and finished in seventh place. His elder brother Ernst was also an Olympic rower.

Veenemans died in a car accident in 1973, aged 26. Since 1975, an annual rowing competition is carried out in his honor.

References

1947 births
1973 deaths
Dutch male rowers
Olympic rowers of the Netherlands
Rowers at the 1972 Summer Olympics
Rowers from Amsterdam
Road incident deaths in the Netherlands
20th-century Dutch people